Fahad Al-Johani  (born September 7, 1987) is a Saudi football player who plays a defender for MS League club Ohod.

References

External links
 

1987 births
Living people
Saudi Arabian footballers
Al-Ansar FC (Medina) players
Ettifaq FC players
Al-Orobah FC players
Al-Wehda Club (Mecca) players
Al-Tai FC players
Abha Club players
Ohod Club players
Khaleej FC players
Saudi First Division League players
Saudi Professional League players
Place of birth missing (living people)
Association football defenders